Neodorcadion calabricum is a species of beetle in the family Cerambycidae. It was described by Reitter in 1889. It is known from Italy.

References

Dorcadiini
Beetles described in 1889